Poliana wintgensi is a moth of the family Sphingidae. It is known from savanna and dry bush from eastern Kenya and Tanzania to Zimbabwe and Mozambique.

The length of the forewings is 34–40 mm. It is very similar to Poliana buchholzi, but smaller and darker, the ground colour being almost blackish in fresh specimens, fading to chocolate in old specimens. The underside of the thorax and abdomen is white. The sexes are superficially identical.

References

Sphingini
Moths described in 1910
Moths of Africa